Turner v. Enrille, 4 U.S. (4 Dall.) 7 (1799), was a 1799 decision of the United States Supreme Court.  The Supreme Court "affirmed the decision in Bingham v. Cabot, et al. (3 D. 382) and reversed the judgment because the record did not show the alienage of the plaintiff below, nor the citizenship of the defendants."

References

External links
 

United States Supreme Court cases
United States Supreme Court cases of the Ellsworth Court
1799 in United States case law